is a Kōya-san Shingon temple in Itano, Tokushima Prefecture, Japan. This is the temple of Inner Sanctum of No.3 Konsen-ji Temple. The temple is said to have been founded by Kōbō Daishi in 815, who also carved the main image of Fudō Myōō. This temple is placed on the Shikoku Pilgrimage Trail. More 2km to No.4 Dainichi-ji temple from here.

For the people from other countries
There is some information for rough sleeping. Please ask in this temple.

See also

 Dainichi-ji
 Jizō-ji

References

Buddhist temples in Tokushima Prefecture
Kōyasan Shingon temples